The 2008 Arab Junior Athletics Championships was the thirteenth edition of the international athletics competition for under-20 athletes from Arab countries. It took place between 20–23 June in Radès, Tunisia – the second time that the country hosted the tournament. A total of 44 athletics events were contested, 22 for men and 22 for women.

The host nation Tunisia topped the medal table with thirteen gold medals among a haul of 45 medals – over a third of the total on offer. Sudan was comfortably the next most successful nation, having eleven gold medals and a total of twenty, and was followed by Egypt on seven golds and ten medals overall. Syria and Bahrain each took three golds, while Qatar was the only other nation to reach double digits with a total of ten medals. Twelve of the thirteen participating nations reached the medal table, with Palestine being the only nation to miss out. Morocco and Algeria, two of the foremost athletics nations of the region, were absent.

Six athletes won multiple individual medals. Jomaa Fayza Omer of Sudan was the athlete of the tournament, as she won the 400 metres, 100 metres hurdles, and 400 metres hurdles titles, was runner-up in the 200 metres, and won a further silver and a gold in the relays with Sudan. Her team mate Amina Bakhit swept the middle-distance events with an 800 metres/1500 metres/3000 metres triple, and also shared in the relay medals. Another Sudanese, Osman Yahia Omar, claimed an 800/1500 m double on the men's side. There were doubles in both the men's and women's short sprints, with Emirati Omar Juma Al-Salfa and Syria's Ghofrane Mohammad taking doubles. Tunisia's Yousra Belkhir claimed an unusual combination of events in the form of the women's pole vault and triple jump.

Javelin thrower Ihab Abdelrahman El Sayed, who broke the championship record in Radès, went on to take a medal at the 2008 World Junior Championships in Athletics two weeks later. Another Egyptian thrower, hammer runner-up Alaa el-Din el-Ashry, was still a junior by the time of the 2010 World Junior Championships in Athletics and reached the podium there. Three Arab junior athletes were still in the youth category and went on to win a medal at the 2009 World Youth Championships in Athletics: Awad El Karim Makki, Mohamed Ahmed Al Mannai and Hamid Mansoor.

Medal summary

Men

 There were four starters in the men's 10,000 m walk, but both Jebril Rahmet Khan and Maher Ben Halima were disqualified.

Women

 A third competitor in the women's hammer throw, Tunisia's Najet Ben Chikha, failed to record a valid mark.

Medal table

References

Results
Championnats Arabes sur piste JuniorsRades, 20 au 23-06-2008. Tunis Athletisme. Retrieved on 2015-05-31.
Al Batal Al Arabi, Volume 66 (pp. 25–36). Arab Athletics Federation (2008). Retrieved on 2015-05-31.
Gomri, Slim (2008-06-24). Arab Junior Championships. IAAF. Retrieved on 2016-07-08.

Arab Junior Athletics Championships
International athletics competitions hosted by Tunisia
Sports competitions in Radès
21st century in Radès
Arab Junior Athletics Championships
Arab Junior Athletics Championships
2008 in youth sport